Shoals is an unincorporated community in the Shoals Township of Surry County, North Carolina, United States.

Geography
The community is located on the Yadkin River near Grassy Creek and is named for the nearby Bean Shoals rapids in the Yadkin River. Area landmarks include Shoals Baptist Church, Shoals United Methodist Church and Shoals Elementary School.

Attractions
Sections of the Pilot Mountain State Park that reach the rapids of the Yadkin River are located in the Shoals community. Also located here is Horne Creek Living Historical Farm, an working farm that is operated by turn-of-the-century technology to showcase what life in northwestern North Carolina was like at the time. The farm is operated by the state of North Carolina Department of Cultural Resources.

References

External links
 Shoals Elementary School
 Horne Creek Living Historical Farm

Unincorporated communities in Surry County, North Carolina
Unincorporated communities in North Carolina